Leonard Stanley Clark (6 March 1914 – 2 May 2000) was an English cricketer.  Clark was a right-handed batsman who bowled right-arm medium pace.  He was born at Manor Park, Essex.

Clark made his first-class debut for Essex against Derbyshire in 1946 County Championship.  He made 23 further first-class appearances for the county, the last of which came against Glamorgan in the 1947 County Championship.  In his 24 first-class appearances, he scored 745 runs at an average of 18.17, with a high score of 64.  This score, which was one of four fifties he made, came against Northamptonshire in 1947.

He died at Leigh-on-Sea, Essex, on 2 May 2000.

References

External links
Len Clark at ESPNcricinfo
Len Clark at CricketArchive

1914 births
2000 deaths
People from Manor Park, London
English cricketers
Essex cricketers